Cobridge is an area of Stoke-on-Trent, in the City of Stoke-on-Trent district, in the county of Staffordshire, England. Cobridge was marked on the 1775 Yates map as 'Cow Bridge' and was recorded in Ward records (1843) as Cobridge Gate.

Cobridge has a car dealer centre (Holdcroft Honda Cobridge) on Sneyd Street, a community centre and a C of E church called Christ Church on Emery Street which is Grade II listed.

Cobridge once had a railway station on the Potteries Loop Line.

There was once an old school house in Cobridge, at the bottom of Sneyd Street and demolished in 1897. A Victorian school once stood adjacent to Christ Church on the corner of Emery and Mawdesley Streets. The old Granville school was replaced by the new Forest Park school. St. Peter's Catholic school still exists in the area.

Cobridge was the location of the Athletic Ground, now the site of a sheltered housing and nursing home complex. Circa 1870, it had a population of 3,378 as recorded in the Imperial Gazetteer of England and Wales.

The Headquarters of the Air Training Corps 388 (City of Stoke-on-Trent) Squadron are at the RFCA Centre, Martin Leake House, Waterloo Road.

References

External links 

 Cobridge Station at thepotteries.org
 Images for SJ8748 at Geograph Britain and Ireland
 Cobridge - 'the changing face of Cobridge' at thepotteries.org
 Cobridge streets at thepotteries.org
 Cobridge, Staffordshire at the FamilySearch Research Wiki
 Christ Church, Cobridge at Hanley Team Ministry

Areas of Stoke-on-Trent